Events in the year 1283 in Norway.

Events

Arts and literature

Births

Deaths
9 April – Margaret of Scotland, Queen of Norway, Queen consort (born 1261).

References

Norway